Gianni Moscon (born 20 April 1994) is an Italian professional cyclist, who currently rides for UCI WorldTeam . He competed at the 2020 Summer Olympics, in the road race.

Early life and career
Moscon grew up in the apple farms north of Trento in Trentino in the north of Italy. This led to him being given the nickname "Il Trattore", which translates to "The Tractor".

Professional career

Team Sky (2016–2021)
This followed a recommendation from Fausto Pinarello, of the company who manufacture the team's bicycles, who had seen Moscon winning amateur races and spoke about him to Sky sport director Dario Cioni.

Moscon recorded his first professional victory at the Arctic Race of Norway when he won the queen stage. He later went on to win the general classification, as well as the youth classification. He was named in the startlist for the 2017 Vuelta a España. In July 2018, he was named in the start list for the 2018 Tour de France.

Controversy

Racism and suspension
During the 2017 Tour de Romandie, Moscon racially abused French cyclist Kévin Reza. He was suspended from racing with Team Sky for six weeks. The team indicated that any further behavioural incidents would result in Moscon's contract being terminated.

Moscon was also accused of purposefully crashing  rider Sébastien Reichenbach during the 2017 Tre Valli Varesine, though the investigation was dropped on the incident due to a lack of evidence, as the crash was not captured on television cameras.

2017 World Championships
Moscon was disqualified from the 2017 UCI World Championships Road Race after being towed back to the peloton by the Italian team car following a crash on the penultimate lap. Moscon ultimately bridged to a breakaway with French rider Julian Alaphilippe in the final five kilometers of the race before finishing 29th. Following the race, Moscon was disqualified by race commissaires.

2018 Tour de France incident
Moscon was disqualified from the 2018 Tour de France after punching Élie Gesbert of  during stage 15.

2020 Kuurne–Brussels–Kuurne
Moscon was disqualified from the 2020 Kuurne–Brussels–Kuurne after he was caught on camera throwing a bike at another rider after a massive crash in the peloton. Upon finding out he was disqualified, he proceeded to remove his race numbers on camera for which he was fined CHF 500. Rider Jens Debusschere, at whom Moscon had thrown the bike, suffered a cut to his hand and wrist and commented at the finish line: "It’s a series of incidents and it's always the same guy. [...] It’s not only this incident, there’s many more incidents. If you ask around in the peloton about how their relation is with him, then ninety per cent will react negatively."

Major results

2012
 4th Overall Giro della Lunigiana
2014
 1st Piccolo Giro di Lombardia
 2nd GP Capodarco
 5th Gran Premio di Poggiana
 6th Giro del Belvedere
 8th Coppa della Pace
 9th Gran Premio Palio del Recioto
 10th Trofeo Alcide Degasperi
2015
 1st  Road race, National Under-23 Road Championships
 1st Gran Premio San Giuseppe
 1st Trofeo Città di San Vendemiano
 1st Coppa dei Laghi-Trofeo Almar
 2nd Ronde van Vlaanderen U23
 4th Road race, UCI Under-23 Road World Championships
 4th Trofeo Banca Popolare di Vicenza
 5th Overall Course de la Paix U23
2016
 1st  Overall Arctic Race of Norway
1st  Young rider classification
1st Stage 3
 3rd Overall Settimana Internazionale di Coppi e Bartali
 National Road Championships
4th Time trial
5th Road race
 5th Overall Tour du Poitou-Charentes
 6th Grand Prix Cycliste de Montréal
 7th Overall Tour de Yorkshire
 8th Nokere Koerse
2017
 National Road Championships
1st  Time trial
5th Road race
 UCI Road World Championships
3rd  Team time trial
6th Time trial
 3rd Giro di Lombardia
 5th Paris–Roubaix
 5th Giro dell'Emilia
 7th Overall Route du Sud
 7th Tre Valli Varesine
2018
 1st  Time trial, National Road Championships
 1st  Overall Tour of Guangxi
1st  Young rider classification
1st Stage 4
 1st Coppa Ugo Agostoni
 1st Giro della Toscana
 1st Stage 3 (TTT) Critérium du Dauphiné
 2nd Trofeo Serra de Tramuntana
 3rd Coppa Sabatini
 5th Road race, UCI Road World Championships
 8th E3 Harelbeke
 8th Trofeo Lloseta–Andratx
2019
 4th Road race, UCI Road World Championships
 5th Time trial, National Road Championships
 6th Overall Tour of Britain
2021
 1st Gran Premio di Lugano
 Tour of the Alps
1st Stages 1 & 3
 4th Road race, National Road Championships
 4th Paris–Roubaix
 7th Coppa Sabatini
 8th Giro della Toscana
 9th Clásica de San Sebastián

Grand Tour general classification results timeline

Classics results timeline

References

External links

 
 
 
 
 
 
 

1994 births
Living people
Italian male cyclists
Olympic cyclists of Italy
Cyclists at the 2020 Summer Olympics
Cyclists from Trentino-Alto Adige/Südtirol
Sportspeople from Trento